Parque de Jogos Comendador Joaquim de Almeida Freitas is a multi-use stadium in Moreira de Cónegos, Braga, Portugal.  It is currently used for football matches and is the home stadium of Moreirense.

The stadium was constructed in 2002 as a result of two successful back to back promotions by the club. The stadium was constructed to play host to Moreirense's home games in the 2002-03 Primeira Liga season. During the season the club came under great criticism due to its lighting towers as well as its safety conditions around the ground. This  led the club to leave the stadium temporarily for a few weeks so that the League association can investigate whether the appropriate facilities and conditions were in place to ensure the safety of the supporters and the players. The stadium was later deemed safe to play in.

References

External links
ZeroZero profile
ForaDeJogo.net profile

Football venues in Portugal
Moreirense F.C.
Sport in Guimarães
Buildings and structures in Guimarães
Sports venues in Braga District
Sports venues completed in 2002